Ambroży Kleks, commonly referred to as Pan Kleks (Mr. Inkblot), is a fictional character in a series of books by Polish writer Jan Brzechwa.  A series of movie adaptations of the books has been directed by Krzysztof Gradowski.

Mr. Kleks is the creator and headmaster of his magical Academy, which is only open for boys whose names begin with an 'A'. In this academy, people eat painted food, talk with heroes of fairy tales and throw ink during classes.

Books
 Academy of Mr. Kleks (Akademia Pana Kleksa, 1946)
 Travels of Mr. Kleks (Podróże Pana Kleksa, 1961)
 Triumph of Mr. Kleks (Tryumf Pana Kleksa, 1965)

Movies
 Academy of Mr. Kleks (Akademia Pana Kleksa, 1983)
 Travels of Mr. Kleks (Podróże Pana Kleksa, 1985)
 Mr. Kleks in space (Pan Kleks w kosmosie, 1988)
 Triumph of Mr. Kleks (Tryumf Pana Kleksa, 2001, animated)

Others
 Academy of Mr. Kleks (musical), 2007

Kleks
Polish literature
Kleks
Kleks
Kleks
1946 novels
Kleks
Books about magic
Novels set in schools
Novels adapted into plays
Novels set in Poland